Boneless fish may refer to:
 Boneless Fish, a product of Dairei Corporation, by which a fish has been deboned and reassembled with a transglutaminase to look like a dressed fish
 Fish fillet, the flesh of a fish which has been sliced from the bone
 Fish finger, a processed food made using the meat of a whitefish which has been battered or breaded
 Fried fish, fish that has been deboned and prepared as food by frying